Rüdiger von Heyking (10 January 1894 – 18 February 1956) was a German officer and Lieutenant General of the Luftwaffe during World War II.

Life 
Heyking was born to a noble family in Rastenburg, East Prussia, at the home of Heyking family.

He joined the cadet corps in 1914 as second lieutenant in the 85th Infantry Regiment "Duke of Holstein". At the outbreak of the First World War, Heyking served on the Western Front where he first trained as and then was appointed company commander. He graduated from the Air Force observer training course on 30 January 1918.

Between September 1942 and November 1943, he commanded the 6th Luftwaffe Field Division on the Eastern Front. From May 1944 he was commander of the 6th Luftwaffe Parachute Division in France. He and two other general officers were captured in September of that year in Mons, Belgium during the German retreat from France.

He spent part of his captivity in Trent Park, a specially supervised internment camp for high-ranking officers. After the war, he was turned over to the Soviet Army and imprisoned in the Soviet Union. He was released from captivity in 1955 and died in Bad Godesberg in 1956.

Awards 
 Iron Cross (1914) 1st and 2nd Class 
 Prussian Military Observer Badge
 Prussian Military Pilot Badge
 Wound Bage (1918) in Black 
 Clasp to the Iron Cross Classes I and II
 German Cross in Gold, on 26 December 1943

Literature 
 Karl-Friedrich Hildebrand: Die Generale der deutschen Luftwaffe 1935–1945 Band 2: Habermehl bis Nuber, Biblio Verlag, Osnabrück 1992,

References 

1894 births
1956 deaths
People from Kętrzyn
People from East Prussia
Prussian Army personnel
German Army personnel of World War I
Reichswehr personnel
Luftwaffe World War II generals
Recipients of the Gold German Cross
Recipients of the clasp to the Iron Cross, 1st class
Lieutenant generals of the Luftwaffe